Jean Serge Essous (born 1935 Brazzaville - died November 25, 2009 in Brazzaville ) was a Congolese saxophonist, clarinetist, and cofounder of the Afrika Team in Paris, France, the band Bantous de la Capital in Brazzaville, Congo, OK Jazz, and Orchestre Rock a Mambo.

On 11 October 2006, UNESCO designated Jean Serge Essous a UNESCO Artist for Peace by UNESCO Director-General Koïchiro Matsuura.

References 

Republic of the Congo musicians
Clarinetists
Saxophonists
2009 deaths
1935 births
People from Brazzaville
TPOK Jazz members
20th-century saxophonists